The UCI Women's Road Cycling World Cup was a season-long road bicycle competition for women organized by the Union Cycliste Internationale between 1998–2015. This competition consisted of a series (which has varied from 6 to 12 events) of races linked together, not only by a common designation, but also by a yearly overall points competition. 

Each World Cup race was a one-day event, with courses ranging from relatively flat, criterium-like courses, to those which have much climbing, as exemplified by La Flèche Wallonne Féminine which ends on the famed Mur de Huy climb with several sections exceeding 15% grades.

Winners

Individuals

Teams
A teams classification was added in 2006.

Races
Click on the blue dots for the corresponding page.

See also
UCI Women's Road Rankings
List of UCI Women's Teams

References

External links
Union Cycliste Internationale

 
Women's Road World Cup
Women's road cycling
UCI tours
Recurring sporting events established in 1998
Defunct cycle racing series
Recurring sporting events disestablished in 2015